Jhonatan is a given name, a variant spelling of Jonathan. Jhonathan may refer to:

Jhonatan Jardines Fraire (born 1980), Mexican politician
Jhonatan Solano (born 1985), Colombian baseball catcher
Jhonatan Luz (born 1987), Brazilian basketball player
Jhonatan Bernardo (born 1988), Brazilian football striker
Jhonatan Longhi (born 1988), Brazilian alpine skier
Jhonathan Camargo (born 1988), Venezuelan road cyclist
Jhonatan Esquivel (born 1988), Uruguayan rower
Jhonatan Rojas (born 1988), Colombian football forward
Jhonatan (footballer, born 1989), full name Jhonatan da Silva Pereira, Brazilian football striker
Jhonatan (footballer, born 2002), full name Jhonatan dos Santos Rosa, Brazilian football midfielder
Jhonatan Restrepo (born 1994), Colombian cyclist
Jhonatan Candia (born 1995), Uruguayan football forward
Jhonatan Narváez (born 1997), Ecuadorian road racing cyclist
Jhonatan Rivas (born 1998), Colombian weightlifter
Jhonatan Amores (born 1998), Ecuadorian racewalker
Jhonatan (footballer, born 1991), full name Jhonatan Luiz da Siqueira, Brazilian football goalkeeper

See also
Jonata (born 1997), full name Jonata de Oliveira Bastos, Brazilian football forward
Jonathan (disambiguation)
Jonatan